Kibumbu is a town in central Muramvya, Burundi, Africa. It lies on the latitude (DMS): 3° 32' 3 S, and the longitude 29° 44' 29 E.

Populated places in Burundi